Kleinia neriifolia, known in Spanish as verode or berode, is a species of flowering plant in the daisy family (Asteraceae).  It is endemic to the Canary Islands. It was formerly named Senecio kleinia.

Description
A succulent plant, 
Kleinia neriifolia has articulated branches (constrictions that make them look like rows of sausages)
The leaves grow clustered in crowded circles at the tops of the branches. Plants can reach 3 m (10 ft) or more. Fragrant grey white flowers appear at any time between March and October. The plant is deciduous, the leaves falling at the beginning of the dry season.
As with many succulents, reproduction by cuttings is possible.

Habitat

Kleinia neriifolia grows abundantly in the Tabaibal-Cardonal zone or the arid, subtropical areas, often with steep and eroded substrates which are more pronounced and dominant in the eastern archipelago.  The vegetation can be compared with that of the arid areas of Sudan, Ethiopia, Arabia and Iran and is typical of the steppe in the African continent.

Horticulture
The plant is used in gardens with dry conditions. The plant requires a minimum exposure to the sun.

Kleinia neriifolia has been successfully cultivated as a houseplant and as landscaping.  It is on a list of suggested fire safe landscaping.

References

External links

neriifolia
Endemic flora of the Canary Islands
Garden plants of Europe
Drought-tolerant plants
Groundcovers